Florent Serra defeated Xavier Malisse, 6–3, 6–4 to win the 2006 Next Generation Adelaide International men's singles competition. Joachim Johansson was the defending champion.

Seeds

Draw

Finals

Section 1

Section 2

External links 
 2006 Next Generation Adelaide International Singles draw
 2006 Next Generation Adelaide International Qualifying draw

Singles